Trenton Robinson (born February 16, 1990) is a former American football safety. He was drafted by the San Francisco 49ers in the sixth round of the 2012 NFL Draft. He played college football at Michigan State University. 
 
He was also a member of the Philadelphia Eagles, Washington Redskins, and Carolina Panthers.

College career
Robinson attended Michigan State University from 2008 to 2011. During his collegiate career, he started 32 of 46 games and recorded 229 tackles and nine interceptions. In the 2011 season, he was voted as a team captain along with quarterback Kirk Cousins.

Professional career

San Francisco 49ers
Robinson was selected with the 180th overall pick of the 2012 NFL Draft by the San Francisco 49ers. He made his NFL debut in the Week 1 win against the Green Bay Packers.

The 49ers released him on August 31, 2013.

Philadelphia Eagles
Robinson was signed to the practice squad of the Philadelphia Eagles on September 2, 2013. He was released by the Eagles on October 8.

Washington Redskins
The Washington Redskins signed Robinson on October 15, 2013.

In the Week 2 win against the Jacksonville Jaguars, he recorded his first career interception on quarterback Chad Henne. 

Robinson re-signed with the Redskins on March 10, 2015. Despite primarily being the backup free safety, he was promoted to the starting strong safety after Duke Ihenacho was placed on the team's injured reserve. In Week 5, he recorded the team's first interception of the 2015 season against Atlanta Falcons quarterback Matt Ryan, which was the second of Robinson's career.  On December 5, 2015, Robinson was waived/injured by the Redskins, and went to the injured reserve list the following day. He was released with an injury settlement on December 15.

Carolina Panthers
Robinson signed with the Carolina Panthers on March 21, 2016.

References

External links

Washington Redskins bio
San Francisco 49ers bio
Michigan State Spartans bio

1990 births
Living people
Sportspeople from Bay City, Michigan
Players of American football from Michigan
American football safeties
American football cornerbacks
Michigan State Spartans football players
San Francisco 49ers players
Philadelphia Eagles players
Washington Redskins players
Carolina Panthers players